Shipton Ridge is the main ridge forming the northeastern arm of the Allan Hills in Victoria Land. Reconnoitered by the New Zealand Antarctic Research Program (NZARP) Allan Hills Expedition, 1964. They named it after Eric Shipton, Himalayan mountaineer, because of his association with Professor N.E. Odell, for whom the adjacent Odell Glacier is named.

Ridges of Victoria Land
Scott Coast